John Mawdley (by 1501 – 6 April 1572), of the Middle Temple, London and Wells, Somerset, was an English politician.

Family
Mawdley was the eldest son of Wells MP, John Mawdley.

Career
He was a Member (MP) of the Parliament of England for Wells in 1529, 1539, 1545, April 1554, 1558 and 1559.

References

1572 deaths
Members of the Middle Temple
People from Wells, Somerset
English MPs 1529–1536
English MPs 1539–1540
English MPs 1545–1547
English MPs 1554
English MPs 1558
English MPs 1559
Year of birth uncertain